Jane's World Railways is a directory of railway activities worldwide.  It is published annually by Jane's Information Group.  Janes World Railways (JWR) provides details on railway systems and operators, manufacturers of equipment, technology and services, and consultancy associations. In updating the content, Janes conducts detailed literature and data searches, reviewing thousands of open source documents and data sources produced by governmental and non-governmental organisations, private businesses, and academic institutions. JWR offers a holistic view of manufacturers, covering their contact information, key personnel and product offerings. A more streamlined layout is aimed at helping clients to navigate and interpret global railway system and operational information efficiently. The publication offers railway profiles with detailed data covering operators and systems in nearly 140 countries, plus information on 2,000 manufacturers, suppliers and service companies.

Goal 
Janes World Railways helps to:
 Monitor competitor activity;
 Locate suppliers and partners;
 Conduct country and company research;
 Learn about privatisation of state-run railroads.

Contents 
Its covers detail analysis and information on following sections:

Equipment:
 Bogies and suspension, wheels, axles and bearings
 Brakes and drawgear
 Cables and cable equipment
 Diesel engines, transmission and fueling systems
 Electric traction, freight yard and terminal equipment
 Locomotives and powered and non-powered passenger vehicles
 Passenger coach and freight vehicles equipment
 Revenue collection systems and station equipment

Data & Technology
 Information technology systems
 Organizational structures
 Passenger information systems
 Principal infrastructure details of networks
 Rolling-stock fleet data
 Signalling and communication systems
 Simulation and training systems
 Traffic and revenue statistics

Contact Information
 Consultancy services
 Electrification contractors and equipment suppliers
 Manufacturers of locomotives and passenger vehicles
 Permanent way components, equipment and services
 Railway associations and agencies
 Rolling-stock leasing companies
 Turnkey systems contractors
 Vehicle maintenance equipment and services

The World Railways Yearbook 17/18 issue costs over US$1320.

Different editions or the last hard cover edition of Janes may also be available, for consultation only, at the public libraries of the larger cities in the English speaking world, inquire locally.

Maps and diagrams 

The yearbook contains many maps of railway systems, which since about 1990 have been redrawn in a consistent style.

The yearbook also contains many diagrams of structure gauges and loading gauges for some but not all countries.

Other data 

The yearbook also give the kind and height of the coupler used by any railway, as well as the height of buffers where used.

The yearbook also gives the minimum radii of many, but not all, railways.

Editors 
 2020 - Ankush Singh 
 2019 - Ankush Singh 
 2018 - Ankush Singh
 2003 - Jackie Clarke & Ken Harris
 1988 - G. Freeman Allen
 1976 - Paul J. Goldsack
 1971 - Henry Sampson

Issue 

 2002-03 is edition forty-four.

See also 

 List of railroad-related periodicals
 Railway coupling by country

External links 
 Jane's World Railways
 (Jane's) Urban Transit Systems

Rail transport publications
Annual magazines published in the United Kingdom